Bytyç is a former municipality in the Kukës County, northern Albania. At the 2015 local government reform it became a subdivision of the municipality Tropojë. The population at the 2011 census was 1,563.

References

Former municipalities in Kukës County
Administrative units of Tropojë